Donald W. Roberts was an insect pathologist and one of the originators of that field. He was especially known for research into biological pest control of Lepidoptera by Metarhizium but also Beauveria bassiana. He was a Research Professor Emeritus in the Biology Department of Utah State University.

Early life and education
Born in Phoenix, Arizona, US, in 1933.

Baccalaureate in Zoology, minoring in Botany, from Brigham Young University in 1957.

Master's degree in Entomology, minor in Mycology, from Iowa State University in 1959.

Postdoctoral career
April 1965, hired as an Assistant Rank Insect Pathologist by the Boyce Thompson Plant Research Institute.

Helicoverpa armigera was spreading and invading several countries around the world in 1976, when he was sponsored by the Rockefeller Foundation and the National Science Foundation (NSF) to test a nuclear polyhedrosis virus in India.

When that was completed in 1978 he then traveled to work for the Brazilian government on fungal controls of pasture spittlebugs. That lasted until 1981.

In 1980 Roberts founded the Insect Pathology Resources Center at Cornell University. Roberts then went back to work for Boyce when the IPRC became part of Boyce.

Roberts collected fungal pathogens of Nilaparvata lugens in Sri Lanka in 1984.

Roberts has been a longtime frequent collaborator of Raymond J. St. Leger, who was also chosen to give the Society for Invertebrate Pathology's Founders Lecture in his honor in 2009.

Awards and honors
1978  US National Science Foundation  US/India Exchange Scientist

1985  Fulbright Senior Research Scholarship to the University of Sydney, Australia
 University of Sydney  Thomas Lawrence Pawlett Scholarship

19861988  The Society for Invertebrate Pathology  Vice President
 Entomological Society of America, Eastern Branch  CIBA-GEICY Recognition Award

19881990  The Society for Invertebrate Pathology  President

1989  ESA-EB  L.O. Howard Distinguished Achievement Award

1996  Boyce Thompson Institute  made Roy A. Young Scientist Emeritus
  Entomological Society of Brazil (Sociedade Brasileira de Entomologia)  honorary membership and recognition award

1996  Society for Invertebrate Pathology  Founders' Lecturer  on Agostino Bassi who had been retired for some time

2009  Society for Invertebrate Pathology  Founders' Honoree award, and Founders' Lecture on his career  given by his friend and longtime collaborator R. St. Leger

Patronymic taxa
The species he has become associated with more than any other  the former M. anisopliae  was renamed Metarhizium robertsii in recognition of his vast contributions.

Selected bibliography
 Ph.D. dissertation, 1964:
 
 
 
 
  AGRIS id US881786488.
 Cited by
 
 Cited by
  INIST PASCAL# 7442687.
 Cited by
  AGRIS id US8854531.
 Cited by
 
 Cited by
 
 Cited by
 
 Cited by
 
 Cited by
 
 Cited by
 
 Cited as "Myco-and entomotoxigenic properties of the efrapeptins: toxins of the fungus Tolypocladium niveum" by among others
 
 Cited by
 
 Cited by
  AGRIS id GB9124448. GS cluster 3368875991079380518.
 Cited by
 
 Cited by
 
 Cited by
 
 Cited by
 
 Cited by
 
 Cited by
 
 Cited by

See also
 Raymond J. St. Leger

References

American lepidopterists
Biological pest control
Brigham Young University alumni
Iowa State University alumni
Society for Invertebrate Pathology
American insect pathologists
University of California, Berkeley alumni
Utah State University faculty